The de Havilland DH.93 Don was a 1930s British multi-role three-seat training aircraft built by de Havilland at Hatfield Aerodrome.

Design and development
The Don was designed to meet Air Ministry Specification T.6/36 for a multi-role trainer and was a single-engined monoplane of wooden stressed-skin construction. The DH.93 Don was intended to be a trainer for pilots and radio operators, and as a gunnery trainer, the gunnery requirement involved the mounting of a dorsal gun turret. Student pilot and instructor sat side by side up front, while accommodation for a trainee WT (radio) operator and the turret gunner was behind in the cabin.

Operational history
The prototype with test marks E-3 (later military serial number L2387) first flew on 18 June 1937 and was transferred to RAF Martlesham Heath for official evaluation. In the course of the trials, more equipment was added which increased the weight, and as a result, in an attempt to reduce weight, the dorsal turret was removed. The aircraft was also modified with small auxiliary fins fitted beneath the tailplane.

Despite the changes incorporated from the fifth aircraft, the type was deemed not suitable for training and the original order for 250 aircraft was reduced to only 50 aircraft, 20 of which were delivered as engineless airframes for ground training. The remaining aircraft served as communications and liaison aircraft, serving with No. 24 Sqn and numerous RAF Station Flights throughout the UK until early 1939, but all were grounded for use as instructional airframes in March 1939.

Operators

Royal Air Force
No. 24 Squadron RAF
station flights

Specifications (Communications role)

See also

References

Bibliography
 The Illustrated Encyclopedia of Aircraft (Part Work 1982–1985). London: Orbis Publishing, 1986. No ISBN.
 Ford, Daniel. "Outmoded Teacher: de Havilland's Don Crew Trainer". Air Enthusiast 105, May/June 2003, pp. 74–75. .
 Jackson, A.J. de Havilland Aircraft Since 1915. London, Putnam, 1962. No ISBN.
 Jackson, A.J. de Havilland Aircraft since 1909. London:Putnam, Third edition, 1987. .

External links

De Havilland Don – British Aircraft Directory

1930s British military utility aircraft
Low-wing aircraft
Single-engined tractor aircraft
Don
Aircraft first flown in 1937